Gmina Brodnica may refer to either of the following rural administrative districts in Poland:
Gmina Brodnica, Kuyavian-Pomeranian Voivodeship
Gmina Brodnica, Greater Poland Voivodeship